Gun Fever is a 1958 American Western film directed by Mark Stevens and written by Stanley H. Silverman and Mark Stevens. The film stars Mark Stevens, John Lupton, Larry Storch, Maureen Hingert, Aaron Saxon, Jered Barclay and Dean Fredericks. The film was released in January 1958, by United Artists.

Plot

A son returns from a year mining to see his parents killed on his first night back, then takes to the trail to search for their killers.

Cast
Mark Stevens as Luke Ram
John Lupton as Simon Weller
Larry Storch as Amigo
Maureen Hingert (as Jana Davi) as Tanana
Aaron Saxon as Trench
Jered Barclay as Singer
Dean Fredericks as Charlie Whitman
Clegg Hoyt as Kane
Jean Inness as Martha Ram
Russell Thorson as Thomas Ram
Robert J. Stevenson as Norris
Cyril Delevanti as Jerry
Bill Erwin as Bartender
Michael Hinn as Stableman
John Goddard as Lee
K.L. Smith as Jack
Iron Eyes Cody as 1st Indian Chief
Eddie Little Sky as 2nd Indian chief
George Selk as Farmer
David Bond as Bit Role

References

External links
 

1958 films
United Artists films
American Western (genre) films
1958 Western (genre) films
Films scored by Paul Dunlap
Revisionist Western (genre) films
1950s English-language films
1950s American films